Kratonohy is a municipality and village in Hradec Králové District in the Hradec Králové Region of the Czech Republic. It has about 600 inhabitants.

Administrative parts
The village of Michnovka is an administrative part of Kratonohy.

Etymology
The name of Kratonohy is derived from the Old Czech words kratonožka, kraťnoha which was a mocking designation for short-legged people. The name is believed to be originating from the 11th or the 12th century.

According to the legend which aimed to cover up the derogatory name, Kratonohy was founded by Býd, the son of Count Slavomil of Kouřim, at the place where he rested with his people for three days. The legend says that the name was derived from "shortening the legs", which figuratively meant tired legs.

Geography
It lies in a flat agricultural landscape of the East Elbe Table.

History
The first written mention of Kratonohy is from 1316, the village of Michnovka was first mentioned in 1720. In the 14th century, a fortress probably existed here, but the oldest written record about the citadel comes from the 16th century. In the second half of the 14th century, owners of the village were the lords of Častolovice, Licek of Kratonohy and Perchta, daughter of Sezema of Kostomlaty. Perchta made a donation of some estates to St. George's Convent in Prague. From 1407 to 1467, Kratonohy was owned by Hroch of Dobřenice and brothers Jiří and Adam Dobřenský.

In 1623, Kratonohy was bought by Alžběta Vchynská of Vchynice na Chlumci. The homestead had been held by the Kinsky family to 1644, but due to mortgages, they sold it to Asterles of Asterfeld. During the 18th century, the Kratonohy estate was merged with Chlumec estate.

Sights

The gate of the homestead was built after 1720 by Jan Santini Aichel or his descendants, is now the property of an agricultural company, and intensively modified.

Church of Saint James the Great is a Gothic based building baroquized in 1707–1710. It has an inwrought interior with an unusual solution: the altar was made as grotto and the rostrum as whale. The altar is a reproduction of a Spanish altar of Saint James the Great from Santiago de Compostela. The wife of manor owner Jan Adam Michna from Vacínov was Spanish, thus it is believed that its interior is the work of Spanish artists. It is one of the most impressive rural church interiors in the country.

Notable people
Rudolf Medek (1890–1940), poet and writer; taught here at school in 1910–1913
Jaroslav Čihák (1891–1944), army officer
Petr Kostka (born 1938), actor; lived and studied here

References

External links

 

Villages in Hradec Králové District